A home fuel cell or a residential fuel cell is an electrochemical cell used for primary or backup power generation. They are similar to the larger industrial stationary fuel cells, but built on a smaller scale for residential use. These fuel cells are usually based on combined heat and power (CHP) or micro combined heat and power (Micro-CHP) technology, generating both power and heated water or air.

A commercially working cell is called Eni-Farm in Japan and is supported by the regional government, which uses natural gas to power up the fuel cell to produce electricity and heated water.

Uses
Since it is in general not possible for a fuel cell to produce at all times exactly the needed amount of both electricity and heat, home fuel cells are typically not standalone installations. Instead they may rely on the grid when the electricity production is above or below what is needed. Additionally, a home fuel cell may be combined with a traditional furnace that produces only heat. For example, the German company Viessmann produces a home fuel cell with an electric power of 0.75kW and a thermal power of 1kW, integrated with a traditional 19kW heat producing furnace, using the grid for electricity needs below and above the fuel cell production.

PEMFC fuel cell m-CHP operates at low temperature  (50 to 100°C) and requires high purity hydrogen. It is prone to contamination, and changes can be made to operate at higher temperatures and improve the fuel reformer. The SOFC fuel cell m-CHP operates at a high temperature (500 to 1,000 °CP) and can handle different energy sources, but the high temperature requires expensive materials to handle the temperature. Changes can be made to operate at a lower temperature. Because of the higher temperature, SOFCs in general have a longer start-up time.

Environmental impact
Because the home fuel cell generates electricity and heat that are both used on site, theoretical efficiency approaches 100%. This is in contrast to traditional or fuel cell non-domestic electricity production, which has both a transmission loss and useless heat, requiring extra energy consumption for domestic heating. As noted above, the home fuel cell can, in general, not at all times generate exactly the needed amount of both heat and electricity, and is therefore typically not a standalone installation but rather combined with a traditional furnace and connected to the grid for electricity needs above or below that produced by the fuel cell. As such, the overall efficiency is below 100%. The optimum efficiency of home fuel cell has caused some countries, such as Germany, to economically support their installation as part of a policy reacting to climate change.

Installation
Home fuel cells are designed and built to fit in either an interior mechanical room or outside—running quietly in the background 24/7. Connected to the utility grid through the home's main service panel and using net metering, the home fuel cells can easily integrate with existing electrical and hydronic systems and are compliant with utility interconnection requirements. In the event of grid interruption, the system automatically switches to operate in a grid-independent mode to provide continuous backup power for dedicated circuits in the home while the grid is down. It can also be modified to run off-the-grid, if desired.

Current installations 
Twenty companies have installed Bloom Energy fuel cells in their buildings, including Google, eBay, and FedEx.  The eBay CEO told 60 Minutes, that they have saved $100,000 in electricity bills in the 9 months they have been installed.

Oregon-based Clear Edge Power had until 2014 installed 5 kW systems at the homes of Jackie Autry, Bay Area Wealth Manager Bruce Raabe and VC investor Gary Dillabough.

In 2013, 64% of global sales the fuel cell micro-combined heat and power passed the conventional mechanical rotary systems in sales in 2012.

Life cycle 
Fuel cells have an average lifetime of around 60,000 hours. For PEM fuel cell units, which shut down at night, this equates to an estimated lifetime of between ten and fifteen years.

Cost
Most home fuel cells are comparable to residential solar energy photovoltaic systems on a dollar per watt-installed basis. Some natural gas-driven home fuel cells can generate eight times more energy per year than the same-sized solar installation, even in the best solar locations. For example, a 5 kW home fuel cell produces about 80 MWh of annual combined electricity and heat, compared to approximately 10MWh generated by a 5 kW solar system. However, these systems are not directly comparable because solar power is a renewable resource with basically no operating cost, while natural gas is neither.

Operating costs for home fuel cells can be as low as 6.0¢ per kWh based on $1.20 per therm for natural gas, assuming full electrical and heat load utilization.

Residential fuel cells can have high initial capital costs – As of December 2012, Panasonic and Tokyo Gas Co., Ltd. sold about 21,000 PEM Eni-Farm units in Japan for a price of $22,600 before installation.

Incentives
In the U.S.A., home fuel cells are eligible for substantial incentives and rebates at both the state and federal levels as a part of renewable energy policy. For example, the California Self Generation Incentive Program (SGIP) rebate ($2,500 per kW) and Federal Tax Credits ($1,000 per kW residential and $3,000 per kW commercial) will significantly reduce the net capital cost to the customer. For businesses, additional cash advantages can be realized from bonuses and accelerated depreciation of fuel cells.

In addition, home fuel cells receive net metering credit in many service areas for any excess electricity generated but not used by putting it back on the utility grid.

The Database of State Incentives for Renewables & Efficiency (DSIRE) provides comprehensive information on state, local, utility, and federal incentives that promote renewable energy and energy efficiency.

California
In California in particular, utilities charge higher per kWh rates as energy consumption rises above established baselines – with the top tier set at the highest rates to discourage consumption at those levels.  Home fuel cells reduce customer exposure to the top tier rates, saving homeowners as much as 45% in reduced annual energy costs.

Market status

Home fuel cells are a new market and represent a fundamental shift in the sourcing of energy.  An individual home fuel cell system installed in a US home becomes a part of the bigger picture of U.S. energy independence.  An ultimate benefit of home fuel cells will be to eventually create networks of micro-CHP systems distributed throughout communities and business parks.  This self-generation of energy in a distributed generation approach will secure and increase US power generating capacity, enabling unused electricity to be sent back to the grids without having to add new power plants and transmission lines.  Putting a home fuel cell system into homes has the potential to get people off-the-grid, play a significant role in energy efficiency, and reduce US dependence on foreign energy imports.

See also 

 Feed-in tariff
 Sustainable energy

References

External links
 US Department of Energy (DOE) Energy Efficiency & Renewable Energy(EERE): Hydrogen, Fuel Cells and Infrastructure Technologies Program
 Fuel Cell Today

Fuel cells
Residential heating
Emerging technologies